The Pearson River is a river of the West Coast region of New Zealand's South Island. It flows north from Mount Aspiring's glacial lake, which is fed by the Volta and Bonar Glaciers, to reach the Waiatoto River.

See also
List of rivers of New Zealand

References

Rivers of the West Coast, New Zealand
Mount Aspiring National Park
Rivers of New Zealand